India House was an informal Indian nationalist organisation based in London between 1905 and 1910.

India House may also refer to:

 India House, London, the diplomatic mission of India in London, UK
 India House, Manchester, UK
 India House, Colombo, Sri Lanka
 India House, Penang, Malaysia
 1 Hanover Square, also known as India House, in New York City, US